Oluwatomi Somefun (born October 2) is a Nigerian business woman and banker. She currently serves as the Managing Director and CEO of Unity Bank plc.

Education and career 
She obtained a B.Ed. in English Language in 1981 from the Obafemi Awolowo University, Ile-Ife in Osun state and an alumnus of Harvard Business school and University of Columbia Business School, New York.

Somefun began her professional career with Peat Marwick and Co. and later moved to Arthur Andersen (now KPMG) before becoming an executive director at Unity Bank plc.

References 

Living people
Year of birth missing (living people)
Nigerian business executives
Nigerian bankers
Obafemi Awolowo University alumni
21st-century Nigerian businesswomen
21st-century Nigerian businesspeople
20th-century Nigerian businesswomen
20th-century Nigerian businesspeople
Nigerian women business executives